Kharagpur is a planned urban agglomeration and a major industrial city in the Paschim Medinipur district of West Bengal, India. It is the headquarters of the Kharagpur subdivision and the largest city of the district. It is located 120 km west of Kolkata and 1300 km south east of the New Delhi. The first Indian Institute of Technology (IIT Kharagpur), one of the Institutes of National Importance, was founded in Kharagpur in May 1950. It has one of the largest railway workshops in India, and the fourth longest railway platform in the world (1072.5 m) along with being the headquarters of the Kharagpur Division of the South Eastern Railways.

History 
Kharagpur received its name from the twelfth king of the Mallabhum dynasty, Kharga Malla, when he conquered it. Kharagpur was a part of the Hijli Kingdom and ruled by Hindu Odia rulers as a feudatory under Gajapati Kings of Odisha. Historians claim that in the 16th century, Kharagpur was still a small village surrounded by dense forests. The village was on high rocky barren land. The only inhabited settlement near Kharagpur was Hijli. Hijli was a small island village on the banks of the Rasulpur River, in the delta of Bay of Bengal.  It developed into a port town in 1687. Hijli was also a province and it existed until 1886.  It covered parts of Bengal and Orissa. It had important towns like Tamluk, Panskura, and Debra, along with the Kelghai and Haldi rivers on the north, south, and east sides bounded by Bay of Bengal and Kharagpur, Keshiary, Dantan, and Jaleswar on the west.

Hijli was ruled by Taj Khan who was the disciple of Guru Peer Mackdram Sha Chisti. It was also ruled by the Kushan, Gupta, and Pal dynasties, and by the Mughals. It is said that Hijli had excellent business and trade centers with judiciary, prison, and administrative offices during the reign of Hindu Kings and during the Mughal Raj. The capital of Hijli was in Bahiri up to 1628 and was shifted to Hijli afterwards. Hijli Province was at its peak in 1754 and was highly prosperous during this period.

Captain Nicolson was the first English colonialist to invade Hijli and captured the port. In 1687 Job Charnock with soldiers and warships captured Hijli, defeating Hindu and Mughal defenders. After the war with the Mughals, a treaty was signed between Job Charnock and the Mughal Emperor. The loss suffered by Job Charnock forced him to leave Hijli and to proceed towards Uluberia, while the Mughal Emperor continued to rule the province. From there, they finally settled at Sutanuti in Kolkata to establish their business in Eastern India. This was the start of the East India Company in India. Hijli as we know it today is only a small part of the Hijli Province, and was created for establishing administrative offices by the British in the 19th century. It is curious that almost the entire Kharagpur division of today has boundaries identical to Hijli Province.

In the 18th century Khejuri, another port town was set up on the banks of the Koukhali River in the delta region. It was established by the British primarily for carrying out trade with European countries. Khejuri was also an island. In the devastating cyclone of 1864, both ports were destroyed. The islands have since merged with the mainland.

Railways in Kharagpur 
The first railway establishment at Kharagpur started with the commissioning of the rail link between Cuttack – Balasore – Kharagpur and from Sini to Kolaghat via Kharagpur.  Kharagpur as a junction station was established in Railway map in December 1898.  The public mood and the reaction of society on introduction of rail transport in this region has been nicely depicted by the famous Bengali Novelist Dr Ramapada Chowdhury (who was born and raised in Kharagpur) in his novel Prothom Prohor. (1954) It is said that the people were initially afraid to travel by train for fear of the bridge collapsing, and for fear of getting outcaste or Dalit status, since there were no separate seating arrangement for different castes and religions. However, things changed due to famines in the early 20th century. The railway company came forward and offered jobs to the local unemployed men, gave them free rides on trains, and even offered blankets to those travelling by train. This promotional scheme broke the taboos and made rail transport acceptable to this society.

Midnapur's District Headquarters was connected to the bank of the Kosai River in February 1900. Construction of the bridge over Kosai completed in June 1901. The rail line from Howrah to Kolaghat up to the Eastern bank and from Kharagpur up to Western bank of Rupnarayan River was completed in 1899. However, trains between Howrah and Kharagpur were possible only in April 1900 after the bridge over Rupnarayan River was completed.

Howrah – Amta light Railway (2 ft gauge - 610 mm) line was completed in 1898 and was operated by M/s Martin & Co. of Calcutta. This link remained operative till 1971. After closure of the light railways, the demand for a broad gauge line between Howrah and Amta gained momentum. The project was completed in four phases. In the first phase, the line between Santragachi and Domjur was completed in 1984. In the second phase it got extended up to Bargachia in 1985, and later up to Munsirhat. Mahendralal Nagar station was completed in 2000, and the final leg to Amta was completed in December 2004.

Former captain of Indian Cricket team Mahendra Singh Dhoni also worked as a ticket collector at the Kharagpur Railway station from 2000 to 2003 before commencing his cricket career playing for India.

The need for a rail link between Panskura and Tamluk was conceived at the beginning of the 20th century, almost at the same time the rail link between Howrah and Kharagpur was opened. The railway company received offers for construction from two Agencies, M/s Martin & Company and M/s Babu Nibaran Chandra Dutta, the former against a guaranteed return of 3.5% while the latter with none. Although the offer of the latter was lucrative, the dilemma of whether to offer the work of construction to a native or not forced the project to be abandoned. After Independence, the requirement of rail link connecting Panskura and Durgachak came up primarily for the purpose of constructing the Haldia Port. The rail link between Panskura – Durgachak via Tamluk completed in 1968, which was later extended to Haldia in 1975. Extension of the rail link to Digha from Tamluk was sanctioned in 1984; it took 20 years to complete, set in two phases. The first phase linked Tamluk and Contai in November 2003, and the tourist destination Digha was connected to Howrah in December 2004.

Geographical location of Kharagpur and its rail links with the rest of the country favored the construction of a centralized workshop with facilities to carry out major repairs of all broad gauge stock. The work was sanctioned in 1900; construction of the workshop was completed in 1904.

Kharagpur has Asia's largest railway Solid State Interlocking (SSI) system.

The Railways also plan to have an East Coast Dedicated Freight Corridor stretching from Kharagpur in West Bengal to Vijayawada of Andhra Pradesh.

Geography

Location

Note: The map alongside presents some of the notable locations in the city. All places marked in the map are linked in the larger full screen map.

Urban structure
Kharagpur is the fourth largest city of West Bengal in area after Kolkata, Durgapur and Asansol. It has an average elevation of 29 metres (95 ft). This sub-division town is formed with Dalma Pahar and alluvial tract of Midnapore. It is intersected by numerous waterways, the important rivers being Subarnarekha, Keleghai and Kangsabati.

Nimpura contains colonies housing thousands of railway employees. There is a long winding road from Nimpura to Hijli which goes through Tangrahut (Arambati), Talbagicha and another from Kalaikunda to Gopali through Hiradihi, Talbagicha and Hijli cooperative society also planned residential area of Kharagpur city. The south of Kharagpur is a planned area belonging to the Indian Railways and which was established by the Britishers as a residential area. Nearby is the Kharagpur Municipality and the fire station. Kharagpur Railway Colony is the biggest railway settlement in India having about 13,000 quarters. There are several railway residential areas namely Chhota Ayma, Bara Ayma, Old Settlement, New Settlement, Mathurakati, Nimpura, South Side, Traffic and several more. The BNR (Bengal Nagpur Railway) ground, owned by the railway, is a very large undeveloped playground which holds great potential to be developed and properly maintained. Outside the railway settlement popular areas are Bhawanipur, Subhaspally, Kharida, Malancha, Inda, Jhapatapur, Talbagicha, Prem Bazaar, amongst others. An important market place has developed in and around Gole Bazaar, a reliable but highly congested shopping destination for locals. Other marketplaces like Talbagicha Bazar, Gate Bazar, Inda Bazar, Puratan Bazar, the Janata Market, the DVC market and the Technology market are also renowned in Kharagpur. Growth is witnessed around Chowringhee and Inda areas where new constructions and projects are taking shape. Big Bazaar, operated by Future Group, was the first mall to open in Kharagpur. It remained the only mall in the town for nearly a decade. Post 2017, a number of new malls and shopping centers have opened, including a Spencer's. The Railway Garden (also known as BNR garden) on the south side of railway station is a park and is frequented by people of all ages, being a popular picnic spot. It offers toy-train rides within the park.

Climate
Kharagpur has a tropical savanna climate (Köppen climate classification Aw). Summers start in March and are hot and humid, with average temperatures close to 30 °C (86 °F). They are followed by the monsoon season that sees about 1140 mm (45 inches) of rain. Winters are brief but chilly, lasting from December to mid February, with average temperatures around 22 °C (72 °F). Total annual rainfall is around 1400mm.

Demographics 

 India census, Kharagpur Urban Agglomeration had a population of 293,719 out of which 150,487 were males and 143,232 were females. The 0–6 years population was 25,130. Effective literacy rate for the 7+ population was 85.61%. This marks higher than the national average literacy rate of 74%.

 India census, Kharagpur had a population of 207,984 (municipality area) and 88,339 (railway settlement area), the fourth largest in West Bengal. Males constituted 52% of the population and females 48%. Kharagpur had an average literacy rate of 64%, higher than the national average of 59.5%: male literacy was 75%, and female literacy was 52%. In Kharagpur, 10% of the population were under 6 years of age. Kharagpur acquires its unique place in India as a town of mixed ethnicity and linguistic diversity.

Kharagpur (Town) police station has jurisdiction over Kharagpur municipality. Kharagpur (Local) police station has jurisdiction over Kharagpur I and Kharagpur II CD Blocks.

The state government is also working on setting up a separate police commissionerate at Kharagpur to enhance the security of this growing region.

Civic administration and utility services 
Kharagpur Municipality looks after civic affairs in the town. There is a proposal to upgrade it to a Municipal Corporation after including the railway area under its jurisdiction. As of now responsibility of civic amenities in railway area lies with the Divisional Railway Manager, Kharagpur Division who is also the head of railway establishment in Kharagpur.

State-owned Bharat Sanchar Nigam Limited, or BSNL, as well as private enterprises, among them Bharti Airtel, Jio and Vodafone Idea are the leading telephone, cell phone and internet service providers in the city.

Healthcare

The need for a centralized Hospital at Khargpur was also felt in the late 19th century. Subsequently, a Hospital with complete medical facilities was established in 1897. Dr Arthur Martin-Leake, Victorian Cross winner was appointed as Chief Medical Officer of Kharagpur Hospital in 1904. However the town still needs good private hospitals and advanced medication and healthcare facilities as in current situation its citizens have to depend on Kolkata for treatment, which is at a distance of 132 km.

Today, the Railway Main Hospital and Kharagpur Sub-divisional Hospital (Chandmari Hospital) are main public sector hospitals in Kharagpur. Recently, since the city lies at an important junction of state and national highways, a Trauma Care Centre of level - 3 category is being set up in Kharagpur Sub-divisional Hospital. A number of private clinics and nursing homes also operate here.

Dr. B. C. Roy Institute of Medical Science & Research is a medical college and hospital near IIT Kharagpur.

Culture
Bengali is the most commonly spoken language of the region. Other common languages are Hindi, Urdu, Odia, and Punjabi

Places of worship include a Durga Mandir and Jama Masjid at Gole Bazar and at Kharida, Sitala Mandir at Puratan Bazar, Kanaka Durga Temple near Nimpura, Jagannath Mandir near Gate Bazar, a Gurudwara at Subhaspally and at Nimpura, Jalaram Temple at Jhapatapur and several religious structures. 

Kharagpur has a Book Fair (Kharagpur Boimela in Bengali) which started in 2000 and is held every January. A Flower Fair (Pushpa Mela in Bengali) is also organized every year.

The city also host a multiplex named Bombay Cineplex.

Education

Colleges
 Indian Institute of Technology Kharagpur
 Kharagpur College (also known as Inda College)
 Hijli College
 Kharagpur Homoeopathic Medical College and Hospital
 Dr B C Roy Institute of Medical Science & Research

Industrial setup

Kharagpur has one of the largest industrial setups in West Bengal. Several large industrial plants are located in and around Kharagpur due to its proximity to Kolkata, good rail and road connectivity via NH 6 and NH 60, availability of labour, and raw materials. Important establishments like Tata Metaliks, Tata Bearings, Siemens, Godrej, Tata Hitachi, Humboldt Wedag, Ramco Cements and Mahindra & Mahindra have set up their plants in and around Kharagpur. Many small iron rolling mills and rice mills dot the town. The Vidyasagar Industrial Park is located here. Establishment of an IT park is also in progress. Kharagpur will be part of two new economic corridors EC-1 Mumbai-Kolkata and EC-14 Kharagpur-Siliguri under Bharatmala project. Recently, the government has revealed plans to establish a civilian airport.

References

External links 

 Kharagpur Municipality
 Midnapore Kharagpur Development Authority(MKDA)
 Kharagpur’s diaspora reunited
 Kharagpur on Encyclopædia Britannica

Literature
Basu, S. (2001). Interaction Between Population and Urban Environment: A Case Study of Kharagpur. Environment, Population, and Development: Felicitation Volume in Honour of Prof. SL Kayastha, p. 275. 

 
Cities and towns in Paschim Medinipur district
Cities in West Bengal